Megachile mavromoustakisi is a species of bee in the family Megachilidae. It was described by van der Zanden in 1992.

References

Mavromoustakisi
Insects described in 1992